Sverdrup Nunataks is a line of peaks in Antarctica trending WNW-ESE and rising to 1,800 m in the northwest part of Carey Range, near the edge of the interior plateau in southeast Palmer Land. They were mapped by United States Geological Survey (USGS) from aerial photographs taken by the U.S. Navy, 1966–69. In association with the names of Antarctic oceanographers grouped in this area, named by the United Kingdom Antarctic Place-Names Committee (UK-APC) in 1977 after Harald U. Sverdrup (1888–1957), Norwegian oceanographer and meteorologist; Director, Scripps Institution of Oceanography, 1936–48; Director, Norsk Polarinstitutt, 1948–57, and Chairman of the International Committee for the Norwegian-British-Swedish Antarctic Expedition, 1949–52.

Nunataks of Palmer Land